Jürg Tschopp (born 1951 in Basel — died 22 March 2011 in the Swiss Alps) was a Swiss biochemist, known for his research on apoptosis and the immunology of inflammation. His greatest achievement was perhaps his team's discovery and scientific description of the inflammasome (which he named).

Biography
Tschopp studied chemistry with his 1974 Diplom thesis supervised by Joachim Seelig at the Biozentrum University of Basel. There Tschopp received in 1979 his doctorate in biophysics under the supervision of Jürgen Engel. As a postdoc Tschopp was supervised by Hans J. Müller-Eberhard at the Scripps Research Institute in La Jolla. There with colleagues he showed "that the lytic pore of complement was formed by C9 multimers." At the University of Lausanne, Tschopp became an assistant professor in 1982, an associate professor in 1987, and a full professor in 1990 in the biochemistry department. Since 2003 he was a co-director of the biochemistry department.

He and his colleagues discovered "viral and mammalian forms of the caspase-8-related protein FLIP" (FLICE-Like Inhibitory Protein, where "FLICE" is an alias for caspase-8). They elucidated the molecular mechanisms of caspase-8's involvement in cell death processes and in nonapoptotic signalling pathways. In 2000 he with 9 co-workers published their discovery "that, similar to apoptosis, caspase-independent cell death (necroptosis) was a tightly controlled cell biological process that was dependent on the kinase RIP1."

He was involved in the discovery of B-cell activating factor (BAFF), also known as B Lymphocyte Stimulator (BLyS), a cytokine that stimulates the reproduction of B cells. This led to the development of a new drug, Belimumab, approved by the FDA in 2011 for systemic lupus erythematosus.

Tschopp's group, and other groups, established that mutations in the gene for the protein NLRP3, also known as cryopyrin, (one of the proteins forming the inflammasome) cause cryopyrin-associated periodic syndrome (CAPS), which is a group of rare autoimmune disorders. Patients with CAPS are "now successfully treated with IL-1 antagonists such as anakinra or blocking antibodies."

In 2005, Tschopp with six colleagues described the function of a "novel cytoplasmic protein complex" involving what is now known as Mitochondrial Antiviral-signaling protein (MAVS), also known as CARDIF or Cardif. The "novel cytoplasmic protein complex ... detects RNA and ... is essential for sensing most intracellular viruses. This complex consists of RIG-I and CARDIF and triggers a robust type I interferon response. His group demonstrated that CARDIF is proteolytically cleaved and inactivated by HCV, thereby explaining the persistence of this viral infection ..."

In 2006 Tschopp with 4 colleagues "showed that gout-associated monosodium urate crystals and pseudogout-associated pyrophosphate dihydrate crystals can stimulate activation of the NLRP3 inflammasome, ... establishing the pathophysiological bases of gout (or pseudogout)-associated inflammatory reactions."

He died of a heart attack on a ski trip with his son in the Swiss Alps. In his youth he was nationally ranked in the decathlon and was later active in hiking, running, and skiing.

When Tschopp died he had an h-index of 105. He was the author or co-author of more than 350 publications. He was the co-editor with Gillian M. Griffiths of the 1995 book Pathways for Cytolysis. Tschopp received several awards, including the European Cell Death Organization's Career Award in 2006, the Louis-Jeantet Prize for Medicine in 2008, and the Novartis Prize for Clinical Immunology (shared with Charles Dinarello) in 2010.

Selected publications

References

Swiss biochemists
Swiss immunologists
Biozentrum University of Basel alumni
Academic staff of the University of Lausanne
1951 births
2011 deaths
Scientists from Basel-Stadt